The Baldwin City Signal was a local weekly newspaper for Baldwin City, Kansas.  The paper was published by The World Company in Lawrence, Kansas.  The circulation was reported as 899.  The newspaper also maintained an online presence.  The World Company closed the Signal on December 31, 2015.

References

External links
 The Baldwin City Signal official website

Newspapers published in Kansas
Douglas County, Kansas